Girdə (also, Girde) is a village in the Agsu Rayon of Azerbaijan.  The village forms part of the municipality of Gürcüvan.

References 

Populated places in Agsu District